Gregory Crozier Gates (April 28, 1926 – January 9, 2020) was an American rower who competed in the 1948 Summer Olympics. He was born in Montclair, New Jersey. In 1948 he was a crew member of the American boat which won the bronze medal in the coxless fours event.  He graduated from Yale College and Harvard Business School.

References 
 
 Greg Gates' obituary 

1926 births
2020 deaths
Rowers at the 1948 Summer Olympics
Olympic bronze medalists for the United States in rowing
People from Montclair, New Jersey
American male rowers
Medalists at the 1948 Summer Olympics
Yale Bulldogs rowers
Harvard Business School alumni